PMG Matric. Higher Secondary. School is a school in Othakalmandapm, Coimbatore, Tamil Nadu, India.

Laboratories  
 Physics lab
 Chemistry lab
 Biology lab
 Computer lab
 Library
 Robotics lab

Facilities 
 Smart Class with Interactive Board
 Foundation Course to NEET, IIT - JEE, AIEEE
 Olympiad Exams
 National Cyber Olympiad (NCO)
 National Science Olympiad (NSO)
 International Mathematics Olympiad (IMO)
 International English Olympiad (IEO)

References

External links 
 Official site

Primary schools in Tamil Nadu
High schools and secondary schools in Tamil Nadu
Schools in Coimbatore
Educational institutions established in 1987
1987 establishments in Tamil Nadu